The 1988–89 season was Real Madrid Club de Fútbol's 87th season in existence and the club's 58th consecutive season in the top flight of Spanish football.

Season 
Real Madrid finished the season as champions for the fourth consecutive season, 5 points ahead of the runners-up this time being FC Barcelona. Real Madrid defeated RCD Espanyol 3–0 on 10 June, becoming champions with two rounds remaining in the season. This was its 24th title in history. Real Madrid also won the Copa del Rey and Supercopa, the first time the club accomplished a domestic treble.

Squad

Transfers

In

 from FC Barcelona
 from RCD Español
 from RCD Mallorca
 from Sporting Gijón

Out

 to Real Madrid Castilla
 to RSC Anderlecht
 to RCD Español
 to Sevilla FC
 to Valencia CF
 to RCD Español

Competitions

La Liga

Results by round

League table

Matches

Copa del Rey

Fifth round

Eightfinals

Quarter-finals

Semi-finals

Final

European Cup

First round

Eightfinals

Quarter-finals

Semi-finals

Supercopa

Statistics

Squad statistics

Players statistics

See also
La Quinta del Buitre

References

Real Madrid CF seasons
Real Madrid CF
Spanish football championship-winning seasons